Fljótsdalshérað was a municipality located in eastern Iceland. In 2020 it merged with three neighbouring Municipalities to form Múlaþing.

References

Former municipalities of Iceland
Eastern Region (Iceland)
States and territories disestablished in 2020